The Carnage Ending is a tenth studio album by Dutch death metal band Sinister. It was released on 28 September 2012 through Massacre Records.

Track listing

Personnel
Sinister
 Aad Kloosterwaard - vocals
 Mathijs Brussaard - bass
 Dennis Hartog - bass, guitars
 Toep Duin - drums
 Bastiaan Brussaard - guitars

Production
 Jörg Uken - producer
 Mike Hrubrovcak - cover art

References

2012 albums
Sinister (band) albums
Massacre Records albums